The Bulls–Knicks rivalry is a rivalry between the Chicago Bulls and the New York Knicks of the National Basketball Association (NBA). The two basketball teams have played each other every year since the Bulls first joined the NBA in 1966.

The rivalry peaked in intensity from the late 1980s to the mid 1990s, when both teams became huge playoff contenders. This was due to a variety of factors: the great frequency in which the teams competed against each other in high-stakes contests and playoff series; well-known players such as Michael Jordan, Scottie Pippen, Patrick Ewing, and John Starks; the reputations of the team's respective cities; and personnel changes and conflicts between the teams. The two teams met in the playoffs during six of the eight years from 1989 to 1996, with the Bulls winning five of those series.

History

Early years
Between 1966 and 1980, the Bulls and Knicks were inter-conference rivals, as the Bulls played in the Western Division/Conference during this period. Both teams were regularly present in the NBA playoffs during the late 1960s to mid-1970s, but neither met in the NBA Finals.

The Bulls of that era, led by Jerry Sloan, Bob Love, Norm Van Lier and Tom Boerwinkle, struggled to advance deep in the playoffs as they regularly lost to powerhouse teams like the Jerry West-led Los Angeles Lakers and Kareem Abdul-Jabbar's Milwaukee Bucks. The Knicks, on the other hand, made three finals and won two championships featuring players such as Willis Reed, Walt Frazier, Bill Bradley, Dave DeBusschere, Jerry Lucas, Earl Monroe and future Bulls coach Phil Jackson.

1981-1988: First Playoff Meeting and Aftermath
In the 1980 offseason, the Bulls moved to the Eastern Conference, making their rivalry with the Knicks an intra-conference affair.

The two teams' first playoff meeting was in first round of the 1981 NBA playoffs, a best-of-three series. Chicago, under head coach Jerry Sloan, won both games to sweep the series against New York 2-0. Chicago would be swept in the next round by the Boston Celtics, the eventual champions, in a best-of-seven series. Sloan was fired during the following season.

In the 1984 NBA Draft, the Chicago Bulls used their first-round pick (3rd overall) to select shooting guard Michael Jordan, who would eventually lead Chicago to six NBA Championships in the 1990s with teammates Scottie Pippen and Dennis Rodman, under the direction of head coach Phil Jackson. The next year, the New York Knicks used their first-round pick (1st overall) in the 1985 NBA Draft to select center Patrick Ewing, who would go on to become one of the Knicks' most notable players over the next 15 years.

1988-1993: Chicago Bulls first dynasty
The Knicks and Bulls met in the playoffs for the second time in 1989. This time, the rivalry was much more pronounced, as the Knicks had just won their first Atlantic Division title since 1971 with a 52-30 record and clinched the 2nd seed in the East. Meanwhile, 6th-seeded Chicago won just 47 games, but was led by reigning NBA MVP and Defensive Player of the Year Michael Jordan. The Bulls won Game 1 in New York, and all three in Chicago to upset the Knicks 4-2 and qualify for the Eastern Conference Finals, which they lost in six games to the eventual champion Detroit Pistons.

When the two teams met again in 1991, their roles were reversed. Chicago led the East with a then franchise-best 61 wins to capture the Central Division title. On the opposite end, the Knicks limped into the playoffs at 39-43 with the 8th seed. Chicago cruised past New York in a 3-game sweep, winning each game by an average of 20 points. They would go on to claim the first NBA Championship in franchise history.

In , the Bulls (having won six more games than the previous season), led by Jordan and Pippen, were on their way to their second straight title when they met the Knicks led by Ewing and new head coach Pat Riley in the Eastern Conference Semifinals. The series went to a decisive Game 7, which the Bulls won 110-81 to advance. This kick-started the intense rivalry and made the Knicks into an Eastern Conference powerhouse, replacing the Pistons and Celtics. This was the first of two Game 7's that the Bulls faced in the six seasons they won a championship, the other with the Pacers in the 1998 Eastern Conference Finals. This particular series became intense, with several players, particularly Michael Jordan, Xavier McDaniel, Scottie Pippen, and Greg Anthony getting into arguments.

Shortly afterwards, there was a moment of peace in the rivalry, with Ewing, Jordan, and Pippen winning gold medals as members of the "Dream Team" at the 1992 Summer Olympics. Ewing, Jordan, and Chris Mullin are the only basketball players to win gold medals as amateurs and professionals, having won at the 1984 Summer Olympics.

In the 1992–93 season, the Knicks finished ahead of Chicago in the regular season and had home court advantage in the Eastern Conference Finals. The series had the notable highlight of Starks dunking over Horace Grant in front of Michael Jordan late in Game 2. However, despite being down 2–0, the Bulls came back and won the next 4 (by doing so, they became the 1st team in NBA history to overcome a 2-0 series deficit in a best-of-7 series, the 2nd team that year, and 4th overall), including a 97-94 Game 5 victory in New York. The game was notable as Knicks forward Charles Smith was stopped 4 straight times by a series of blocks and strips in the final seconds while trying to score. The Bulls won Game 6 96-88 to advance to the 1993 NBA Finals, where they beat the Suns in 6 games for their first three-peat.

1993-1998: Chicago Bulls second dynasty
With Jordan's absence in  the Knicks had the upper hand and compiled the second best record in the East. The Bulls, led by Pippen and newcomer Toni Kukoč, met the Knicks in the second round, where the series went 7 games. Game 3 of the series was marred by a brawl between Jo Jo English and Derek Harper in which both players rolled into the stands. What made things worse was that the brawl took place with NBA Commissioner David Stern in attendance. The Bulls had a 19-point lead entering the 4th, but the Knicks tied it with 1.8 seconds left on a Patrick Ewing hook shot. Scottie Pippen famously refused to take the floor after Phil Jackson drew the final play for Kukoc, who hit a buzzer-beater to win the game. In one of the most argued calls in NBA history, a questionable foul was called by Hue Hollins in the closing seconds of Game 5 against Pippen, which gave Hubert Davis two free throws to turn a one-point deficit into a one-point victory for the Knicks.

After a blowout Bulls win in Game 6, the Knicks advanced past the Bulls with a series-clinching 87-77 win, but eventually lost to the Rockets in the 1994 NBA Finals. This was the only time the Knicks were able to beat the Bulls in the playoffs during this era. Also, all the games in the series were won by the home team, and the Knicks had home court advantage in the series.

In , Jordan returned in the latter half of the regular season. In his return to the Garden, his 5th game back, Jordan scored 55 in a Chicago win. This game lifted Jordan's confidence after a mediocre performance in his "comeback game" against the Pacers. They didn't meet in the playoffs that season, but the animosity between the teams still grew.

During the Bulls' record-setting 1995–96 season, they suffered their worst loss of the season to the Knicks, 102-74 in March. Two months later, they defeated the Knicks in the Eastern Conference Semifinals in 5 games.

During the Bulls' second three-peat, they only met in the playoffs once; in 1996 when the Bulls defeated the Knicks. It was also during this period that other teams in the East grew to be contenders, such as the Indiana Pacers, Orlando Magic, and Miami Heat. All of these teams had their own heated battles with either the Bulls or Knicks in the playoffs.

In the 1990s, both Knicks Finals appearances (1994 and their Cinderella march of ) followed a Bulls' 3-peat, but the Knicks lost both times to a team from Texas (Rockets & Spurs).

Later years
The departures of Jordan, Pippen and Ewing led to the decline of both the Bulls and Knicks, and neither team was able to recapture the same success they enjoyed in the 1990s.

Nevertheless, three notable moments during the new millennium kept the rivalry alive. On January 18, 2005, Ben Gordon scored a game-winning layup to lead the Bulls past the Knicks at Madison Square Garden. Then on April 8, 2012, Carmelo Anthony's three-point shot in overtime gave the Knicks the win at home over Chicago. Finally, on October 31, 2013, Derrick Rose banked in a game-winning field goal to beat the Knicks at the United Center.

Causes
The significance of the rivalry was due partly to the bragging rights of the two biggest cities in the East: the Big Apple vs. the Windy City. The physical play of the teams made it intense, especially in the playoffs. The matchup between Jordan and Starks brought some drama as they were both intense players who showcased a number of highlight dunks on the opposing team. Despite the Knicks not winning an NBA title or beating the Bulls in a postseason series while Jordan was in the league, this rivalry was considered the most contentious of the 1990s.

Head to head
The results in brackets concern the playoff games.

Statistics

Common players
The following players have played for both the Bulls and the Knicks in their careers:
John Starks - Knicks (–), Bulls
Greg Anthony - Knicks (–) Bulls
Derrick Rose - Bulls (–) Knicks (–present) 
Joakim Noah - Bulls (–) Knicks (–)
Taj Gibson - Bulls (–) Knicks (–present)
Charles Oakley and Bill Cartwright, who were traded for each other in 
Tom Thibodeau Head Coach Bulls (–), Head Coach Knicks (–present)
Doug McDermott - Bulls (–) Knicks (–)
Tyson Chandler - Bulls (–) Knicks (–)

See also
 Bulls–Pistons rivalry
 Heat–Knicks rivalry
 Bears–Giants rivalry, a similar rivalry in the NFL between Chicago and New York City-based teams
 National Basketball Association rivalries

References

National Basketball Association rivalries
Chicago Bulls
New York Knicks